Richmond War Memorial may refer to:

 Richmond War Memorial, London in England
 Virginia War Memorial in Richmond, Virginia, United States
 South African War Memorial, Richmond Cemetery in London, England